Lupanga is a mountain in Tanzania, close to the town of Morogoro.

The top peak is around 2,150 meters above sea level. It is part of the Uluguru Mountains.

References 

Mountains of Tanzania